Pendetide (GYK-DTPA) is a chelating agent. It consists of pentetic acid (DTPA) linked to the tripeptide glycine (G) – L-tyrosine (Y) – L-lysine (K).

Use
The following monoclonal antibodies are linked to pendetide to chelate a radionuclide, indium-111. The antibodies selectively bind to certain tumour cells, and the radioactivity is then used for imaging of the tumours.
 Indium (111In) capromab pendetide (prostate cancer)
 Indium (111In) satumomab pendetide (other cancer types)

References

Chelating agents
Chelating agents used as drugs
Carboxylic acids
Peptides